Emerson Columbus Harrington (March 26, 1864December 15, 1945) was an American politician serving as the 48th Governor of Maryland from 1916 to 1920.  He also served as Comptroller of the Maryland Treasury from 1912 to 1916.

Early life, career, and family
Emerson Harrington was born to John E. Harrington and Elizabeth Thompson Harrington in the town of Madison in Dorchester County, Maryland.  He attended the public schools of Madison until he turned 16, at which point he went on to attend St. John's College in Annapolis, Maryland.  He received a bachelor's degree in 1884 and a master's degree two years later.  He became a tutor at the college after graduation, and, as a result of an instructor falling ill, was elected to be an assistant professor.  Before assuming his new position, he accepted a position as principal at the Cambridge Academy, a position he served in for 12 years.  He married Gertrude Johnson on June 27, 1893, and with her had three children, Emerson C. Jr., Mary Virginia, and William Johnson.

State political career
After studying law, Harrington was admitted to the bar in 1898 and commenced practice soon thereafter.  In 1899, he was elected as the State's Attorney for Dorchester County, and served in that position until his election defeat in 1903.  As state's attorney, Harrington gained a reputation as a hard-liner, and was an aggressive prosecutor.  This, along with party conflict, contributed to his defeat.

Harrington resumed the practice of law in Cambridge, Maryland in 1903.  In 1910, he was appointed as Insurance Commissioner, a position he served in until he was elected Comptroller of Maryland in 1911.  During the election, he defeated Republican challenger John A. Cunningham by 7,800 votes.  Harrington was re-elected two years later, defeating challenger Oliver Metzerott by a comfortable margin.

Governor of Maryland
In 1915, Harrington chose to run for Governor of Maryland.  During the heated Democratic primary, Harrington's opponent Blair Lee I accused him of poorly managing the state's finances during his tenure as Comptroller, and Baltimore Mayor John H. Preston spoke ill of Harrington regarding his handling of a dispute between Baltimore City and Pennsylvania Railroad.  The disputes were settled, however, and Harrington won the Democratic primary.  During the general election, Harrington defeated Republican Ovington E. Weller by 3,181 votes and was sworn in as governor on January 12, 1916.

As governor, one of Harrington's primary initiatives was to establish a ferry service between the Eastern Shore and Annapolis.  The Claiborne-Annapolis Ferry Company began service in June 1919, and the first ferry was named after the governor.  During World War I, Harrington established the Council of Defense, which assisted in the establishment of armories throughout the state, including at the Maryland Agricultural College.  The council also lobbied for the creation of a military base, which later became Fort George G. Meade.

Regarding social issues of his era, Harrington's views on women's suffrage and prohibition caused surprise to many Marylanders.  In a state that was widely considered to be "wet", or in favor of legal alcohol, Harrington caused a great deal of upheaval when he announced his support of prohibition, citing concerns for the common welfare.  He also surprised his constituents with his support of the proposal to grant voting rights to women, even though he was believed to be against such an initiative.

Harrington's term as governor ended on January 14, 1920, and afterwards he returned to his law practice.  He remained active in politics, but was unsuccessful in an election for judge of the First Judicial Circuit in 1926, and was again unsuccessful in an election for the First Congressional District of Maryland.  Harrington served as President of the People's Loan, Savings and Deposit Bank of Cambridge, Maryland, and also as the President of the President of the Annapolis-Claiborne Ferry Company, that he had established as governor, until operations were taken over by the state.

He died at his home in December 1945 from a short illness, and was buried in the cemetery of the Christ Episcopal Church in Cambridge, Maryland.

References

External links

|-

|-

|-

1864 births
1945 deaths
American Episcopalians
Comptrollers of Maryland
Democratic Party governors of Maryland
People from Dorchester County, Maryland
St. John's College (Annapolis/Santa Fe) alumni